Almas Kishkenbayev (or Kishkenbaev) (born June 1, 1985) is a Kazakh singer who rose to popularity after winning SuperStar KZ, the Kazakh version of Pop Idol, shown by Perviy Kanal Evraziya.

Almas is also the second only Idol winner who was previously a Wildcard on the show, next to Canada's Ryan Malcolm from Canadian Idol. Almas advanced to the finals as the jury's choice even though he received 3rd highest votes.

Nikolai Pokotylo – 27.4%Aynur Shankilova – 25.4%Almas Kishkenbayev – 14.3%

SuperStar KZ performances
Kyzylorda Auditions: 
Semi Finals: 
Wildcards: 
Top 12: You're My Everything
Top 11: Говори
Top 10: Последняя Поэма by Valeriya
Top 9: Everything I Do (I Do It For You) by Bryan Adams
Top 8: Жігіттер Жыры by Dos Mukasan
Top 7: Soli
Top 6: Беловежская Пуща
Top 5: Love To See You Cry by Enrique Iglesias
Top 5: Insatiable by Darren Hayes
Top 4: Немного Жаль by Filipp Kirkorov
Top 4: О, Махаббат by Medeu Arynbayev
Top 3: Belle
Top 3: Девушки, Как Звезды by Andrey Gubin
Grand Final: Три Волшебных Слова
Grand Final: Кен Дала
Grand Final: Love To See You Cry by Enrique Iglesias

Discography
Мәңгілікке

Мой HiT #1 (My HiT #1) singing Золотая Пора (Golden Season)

Мой HiT 3 (My HiT #3) singing Мәңгілікке

External links
Almas Kishkenbayev – Bio (In Russian)

1985 births
Living people
Idols (franchise) participants
Idols (TV series) winners
21st-century Kazakhstani male singers
Kazakhstani pop singers
Kazakh folk singers
SuperStar KZ
Baritones